Catherine Gonnard is a French art critic, journalist, essayist and LGBTQ+ historian.

Career 

With Elisabeth Lebovici she co-edited Femmes Artistes / Artistes Femmes: Paris, de 1880 à Nos Jours, which was published in 2007, and has authored or co-authored other pieces on the intersection of art and feminism.

References

French art critics
French women art critics
French essayists
French women essayists
French historians
French women historians
French journalists
French women journalists
LGBT historians
Living people
Year of birth missing (living people)